James Finley House may refer to:

James Finley House (Harshaw, Arizona), listed on the National Register of Historic Places in Santa Cruz County, Arizona
James Finley House (Chambersburg, Pennsylvania), listed on the National Register of Historic Places in Franklin County, Pennsylvania

See also
Finley House (disambiguation)